Jerry Lyons is a former American football coach. He was the head football coach for the Portland State University in Portland, Oregon.  He held that position for five seasons, from 1963 until 1967.  His coaching record at Portland State was 21–24–1.

Head coaching record

College

References

Year of birth missing (living people)
Living people
Portland State Vikings football coaches
High school football coaches in Oregon
University of Oregon alumni
University of Washington alumni